The Sun Odyssey 42 CC (Center Cockpit), also called the Jeanneau 42 CC, is a French sailboat that was designed by Guy Ribadeau Dumas as a cruiser and first built in 1996.

The Sun Odyssey 42 CC is one of a series of designs with similar names and intended markets, including the 1990 Sun Odyssey 42, 1992 Sun Odyssey 42.1, the 1995 Sun Odyssey 42.2, the 2005 Sun Odyssey 42i and the 2007 Sun Odyssey 42 DS.

The Sun Odyssey 42 CC uses the same hull design as the Sun Odyssey 42.2.

Production
The design was built by Jeanneau in France, starting in 1996, wkith 45 boats completed, but it is now out of production.

Design
The Sun Odyssey 42 CC is a recreational keelboat, built predominantly of fiberglass. It has a center cockpit, a masthead sloop rig, a raked stem, a reverse transom with steps to a swimming platform, an internally mounted spade-type rudder controlled by a wheel and a fixed fin keel with a weighted bulb.

The boat is fitted with a Japanese Yanmar  diesel engine for docking and maneuvering. A  diesel engine was a factory option.

The design has sleeping accommodation for four people, with a double "V"-berth in the bow cabin, a "U"-shaped settee and two single seats in the main cabin and an large aft cabin with a double berth. The galley is located on the starboard side just aft of the companionway ladder. The galley is "U"-shaped and is equipped with a four-burner stove, an ice box and a double sink. A navigation station is opposite the galley, on the port side. There are two heads, one just aft of the bow cabin on the starboard side and one on the port side in the aft cabin.

Operational history
In a 1997 review Bill Lee wrote for Cruising World, "the Jeanneau 42 CC, like so many center-cockpit boats under 42 feet the aft cabin is wonderful and guest accommodations are somewhat squeezed. This is fine by our criteria because we assume that the primary user will be a couple who may live onboard for extended periods. The owner's berth is 65 inches wide on centerline, and the cushions are split so that a centerline lee cloth can be fitted when at sea. The companionway ladder is well done with even steps that curve up on the ends for footing when heeled. The galley is located in the passageway to the aft stateroom. It is a good working galley with huge refrigerator capacity"

See also
List of sailing boat types

References

External links

Photo of a Sun Odyssey 42 CC showing transom
Photo of a Sun Odyssey 42 CC showing bow

Keelboats
1990s sailboat type designs
Sailing yachts
Sailboat type designs by Guy Ribadeau Dumas
Sailboat types built by Jeanneau